Anthene schoutedeni, the Schouteden's hairtail or Schouteden's indigo ciliate blue, is a butterfly in the family Lycaenidae. It is found in Sierra Leone, the east-central part of the Democratic Republic of the Congo, Ethiopia, Uganda, Rwanda, Burundi, Kenya and north-western Tanzania. The habitat consists of forests.

References

Butterflies described in 1924
Anthene